Jinniu may refer to:

Jinniu District (金牛区), in Chengdu, Sichuan, China
Jinniu Energy, conglomerate company based in Xingtai, Hebei, China
Jinniu, Qing County (金牛镇), town in Qing County, Hebei, China